Reinas al Rescate (English: Queens to the Rescue) is a reality documentary series featuring the host and judge of Drag Race España: Supremme de Luxe, with its former contestants: Sharonne, Pupi Poisson, and Estrelle Xtravaganza. The series is available through Atresplayer Premium and started to premiere on 10 July 2022.

In the series, the four drag queens travel across Spain meeting members of the LGBT community, based in rural areas and bringing visibility to the experiences of LGBTQ people who live outside large cities.

Background 
Each episode focuses on the story of an individual who has called on the queens for support with an LGBTQ-related issue. The queens speak to the protagonist and the people around them about their experiences and offer help and guidance. Each episode ends with a local drag event featuring the protagonist and two of their friends or family members to raise awareness of LGBTQ issues among rural communities.

Episodes

References

External links 
 

2020s LGBT-related reality television series
2022 in LGBT history
2022 Spanish television series debuts
Atresplayer Premium original programming
Spanish LGBT-related television shows
Television series by Buendía Estudios